James Moorcraft (14 January 1669 - 9 April 1723) was an Anglican priest in Ireland during the late 17th and early 18th centuries.

Moorcraft was born in Lancashire and educated at Trinity College, Dublin.  He was  Archdeacon of Meath from 1698 until his death.

References

Alumni of Trinity College Dublin
18th-century Irish Anglican priests
Archdeacons of Meath
1723 deaths
Clergy from Lancashire
1669 births